John Melvin Gerrard (born November 2, 1953) is a Senior United States district judge of the United States District Court for the District of Nebraska.

Education and legal career 

Gerrard graduated from Nebraska Wesleyan University with a Bachelor of Science in 1976; from the University of Arizona with a Masters in Public Administration in 1977; and from McGeorge School of Law at the University of the Pacific with a Juris Doctor in 1981. He is a member of Phi Kappa Tau fraternity. Prior to joining the bench, he was in private practice in Norfolk, Nebraska from 1981 to 1995 and was city attorney for Battle Creek, Nebraska from 1982 to 1995.

Judicial service

Nebraska Supreme Court 

In 1995, Governor Ben Nelson appointed Gerrard to the Nebraska Supreme Court. At 41 years of age, Gerrard was the youngest ever appointee to the Nebraska Supreme Court. He left the court in 2012 upon appointment to the federal bench.

Federal judicial service 
In January 2011, then Senator Ben Nelson, recommended Gerrard to fill a seat on the United States District Court for the District of Nebraska that would be vacated later that year by Judge Richard G. Kopf. On May 4, 2011, President Barack Obama formally nominated Gerrard to replace Kopf on the federal bench. The United States Senate Committee on the Judiciary reported Gerrard's nomination to the Senate floor on October 13, 2011. The Senate confirmed Gerrard's nomination on January 23, 2012, by a 74–16 vote. He received his commission on February 6, 2012. He served as chief judge from 2018 to 2021. Gerrard assumed senior status on February 6, 2023.

See also
Nebraska Supreme Court

References

External links

State Judicial Branch. Legislature of Nebraska. Accessed 2011-02-01.
Honorable John M. Gerrard. Nebraska Supreme Court. Accessed 2011-02-01.
Phi Kappa Tau Hall of Fame. Phi Kappa Tau. Accessed 2011-02-01.

1953 births
Living people
21st-century American judges
Judges of the United States District Court for the District of Nebraska
Justices of the Nebraska Supreme Court
McGeorge School of Law alumni
Nebraska state court judges
Nebraska Wesleyan University alumni
People from Madison County, Nebraska
People from Norfolk, Nebraska
People from Schuyler, Nebraska
United States district court judges appointed by Barack Obama
University of Arizona alumni